Daniel Ernest Cameron (1924 – 12 April 2009) was the Leader of the Opposition in the Legislative Assembly of New Brunswick, Canada, from 1991 to 1995, as leader of the New Brunswick Confederation of Regions Party, a conservative political party.

Career
Cameron was born in 1924 at Osgoode, Ontario, the son of James W. Cameron and Euphemia Madden. Cameron represented the riding of York South. He had previously assisted the former Progressive Conservative Member of Parliament  as his chief of staff for many years. Cameron served in the Royal Canadian Air Force during World War II.

He was viewed by many of the more hardline CoR members as being too soft on the issues. The party's machine (President, Executive, Council) tried to overthrow him, but their attempts failed, and although they and the membership elected Brent Taylor as leader, Cameron was able to successfully argue that leadership convention was illegal. After a conflict with the former leader of the party Arch Pafford, Cameron had Pafford expelled from the party, along with those in the party machine who had opposed him. When he stepped down as leader, he was replaced with a candidate that was widely seen as part of the "Anti-Cameron" camp.

Cameron did not run again in the 1995 election. He died aged 85 at Fredericton's Everett Chalmers Hospital.

References

New Brunswick Confederation of Regions Party MLAs
1924 births
2009 deaths
Royal Canadian Air Force personnel of World War II